Kisha e ancitit is a church in Breg-Lum, Kukës County, Albania. It is a Cultural Monument of Albania.

References

Cultural Monuments of Albania
Buildings and structures in Tropojë
Churches in Albania